John Lowndes McLaurin (May 9, 1860 – July 29, 1934) was a United States representative and Senator from South Carolina. He was born in Red Bluff, South Carolina, in Marlboro County, South Carolina and attended schools at Bennettsville, South Carolina and Englewood, New Jersey as well as Bethel Military Academy (near Warrenton, Virginia) and Swarthmore College (in Pennsylvania.) He graduated from the Carolina Military Institute, studied law in the University of Virginia at Charlottesville, was admitted to the bar in 1883 and practiced in Bennettsville. He was a member of the South Carolina House of Representatives in 1890-1891 and was attorney general of the State from 1891 to 1892. And a time when Benjamin Tillman was making demagogic appeals to the white working class, McLaurin became one of the first upper-class South Carolinians to support him. Tillman in 1892 pinned the nickname "Little Curly Headed Joe" that stuck for the remainder of McLaurin's life.

McLaurin broke with Tillman in 1894 and they became bitter enemies. Tillman accused him of accepting bribes from the Textile industry, which led to the famous fistfight between the two on the Senate floor on 22 February 1902. Both men were censured.

McLaurin was elected In 1892 as a Democrat to the Fifty-second Congress to fill the vacancy caused by the death of Eli T. Stackhouse; he was reelected to the Fifty-third, Fifty-fourth, and Fifty-fifth Congresses and served from December 5, 1892, until May 31, 1897, when he resigned. He was appointed and subsequently elected as a Democrat to the U.S. Senate to fill the vacancy caused by the death of Joseph H. Earle and served from June 1, 1897, to March 4, 1903; he was not a candidate for reelection. In Congress, he specialized in fiscal affairs.

McLaurin practiced Law in New York City. He later returned to farming in Bennettsville and was Elected to the South Carolina Senate, 1914-1915. He was author of the State warehouse system for storing and financing cotton, and served as State warehouse commissioner from 1915 until his resignation in 1917. He died at his estate near Bennettsville in 1934; interment was in McCall Cemetery.  His home, the Robertson-Easterling-McLaurin House, was listed on the National Register of Historic Places in 1984.

See also
 List of federal political scandals in the United States
 List of United States senators expelled or censured

References

External links

|-

|-

1860 births
1934 deaths
Censured or reprimanded United States senators
Democratic Party members of the United States House of Representatives from South Carolina
Democratic Party United States senators from South Carolina
Lawyers from New York City
Democratic Party members of the South Carolina House of Representatives
People from Marlboro County, South Carolina
Political violence in the United States
South Carolina Attorneys General
South Carolina lawyers
Democratic Party South Carolina state senators
Swarthmore College alumni